The WTA 125K series is the secondary professional tennis circuit organised by the Women's Tennis Association. The 2020 WTA 125K series calendar consists of only three tournaments, shortened from the original schedule of fourteen tournaments due to the COVID-19 pandemic.

Schedule

Canceled and postponed without new date in 2020

Statistical information 
These tables present the number of singles (S) and doubles (D) titles won by each player and each nation during the season.  The players/nations are sorted by: 1) total number of titles (a doubles title won by two players representing the same nation counts as only one win for the nation); 2) a singles > doubles hierarchy; 3) alphabetical order (by family names for players).

To avoid confusion and double counting, these tables should be updated only after an event is completed.

Titles won by player

Titles won by nation

Points distribution

See also 

2020 WTA Tour
2020 ITF Women's World Tennis Tour
2020 ATP Challenger Tour

References 

 
2020 in women's tennis
2020